The Woka River-I Hydropower Station,  also spelled Wokahe First-cascade Hydro Station, is a water conservancy project in Tibet,  located in Sangri County,  Shannon City. 

Woka River-I Hydropower Station is one of the "Sixty-two Aid-Tibet Projects" (62项援藏工程) identified by the Central Committee of the Communist Party of China. The hydropower station is mainly for hydroelectric power generation and has a small-scale irrigation function,   and the construction was undertaken by the Third Corps of Armed Police Hydropower Troops (武警水电第三总队).

History
The construction of the project started in April 1996 with an investment of ¥861.1 million by the China Development Bank and was completed on 12 October 2000 with a total installed capacity of 20,000 kilowatts. It has an annual power generation capacity of 73 million kilowatt hours.

References 

2000 establishments in China
Dams completed in 2000
Dams in China
Energy infrastructure completed in 2000
Hydroelectric power stations in Tibet